Of Time and the River (subtitled A Legend of Man's Hunger in his Youth) is a 1935 novel by American author Thomas Wolfe. It is a fictionalized autobiography, using the name Eugene Gant for Wolfe's, detailing the protagonist's early and mid-twenties, during which time the character attends Harvard University, moves to New York City and teaches English at a university there, and travels overseas with the character Francis Starwick. Francis Starwick was based on Wolfe's friend, playwright Kenneth Raisbeck. The novel was published by Scribners and edited by Maxwell Perkins.

The Good Child's River was meant to be part of Of Time and the River but  most of it was never typed up from the three handwritten ledgers which Suzanne Stutman uncovered in the William B. Wisdom Thomas Wolfe Collection of Harvard's Houghton Library manuscript collection. Unlike Wolfe's major novels, The Good Child's River doesn't include either Eugene Gant or George Webber, Wolfe's fictional counterparts, but instead focuses on Webber's lover, Esther Jack (based on Aline Bernstein). Bernstein made many notes about her life for Wolfe, who fashioned the material into The Good Child's River. 

A Howard Rodman adaptation of this story was presented in the Hallmark Hall of Fame on 4 October 1953, starring Thomas Mitchell as William Oliver Gant. The English composer John McCabe's Fourth Symphony is subtitled Of Time and the River.

The process of editing Of Time and the River was featured heavily in the 2016 film  Genius.

Excerpt 
"At that instant he saw, in one blaze of light, an image of unutterable conviction, the reason why the artist works and lives and has his being—the reward he seeks—the only reward he really cares about, without which there is nothing. It is to snare the spirits of mankind in nets of magic, to make his life prevail through his creation, to wreak the vision of his life, the rude and painful substance of his own experience, into the congruence of blazing and enchanted images that are themselves the core of life, the essential pattern whence all other things proceed, the kernel of eternity."

References

External links 
 
 Of Time and the River (full text)
 http://www.fantasticfiction.co.uk/w/thomas-wolfe/of-time-and-river.htm
 http://themoderatevoice.com/18304/guest-book-review-of-time-and-the-river-by-thomas-wolfe/

1935 American novels
Novels by Thomas Wolfe
American novels adapted into television shows